The 1991 Welwyn Hatfield District Council election took place on 2 May 1991 to elect members of Welwyn Hatfield District Council in England. This was on the same day as other local elections.

The council was elected on partial new ward boundaries, leading to some wards electing all of their councillors, while other wards only elected one councillor as normal. The total number of councillors increased by 4 from 43 to 47.

Summary

Election result

References

Welwyn Hatfield
Welwyn Hatfield Borough Council elections
1990s in Hertfordshire